The first lady of Trinidad and Tobago is the title attributed to the wife of the president of Trinidad and Tobago and the first gentleman of Trinidad and Tobago to the husband of the president of Trinidad and Tobago, a position created in 1976. The position was last held by Reema Harrysingh-Carmona, wife of President Anthony Carmona, from 2013 to 2018. To date, there have been no first gentlemen of Trinidad and Tobago as the first (and incumbent) female president, Paula-Mae Weekes, is unmarried.

The position should not be confused with the husband or wife of the prime minister of Trinidad and Tobago.

First ladies of Trinidad and Tobago

References

External links
 Office of the President of the Republic of Trinidad and Tobago: First Lady's Profile

Trinidad and Tobago